The Merrick, or simply Merrick, is a mountain in the Range of the Awful Hand, a sub-range of the Galloway Hills range, part of the Southern Uplands of Scotland.

Line of sight
The  view between Merrick and Snowdon is the longest line of sight in the British Isles . Although theoretically visible, looking from S-N, Merrick is almost entirely obscured by Lamachan Hill and as such, confirmed sightings are very rare.

Granite boulders
An interesting feature on the mountain is the presence of several large partly buried granite boulders at about 800 m on the broad west ridge. They are glacial erratics, but the exact mechanism is unclear that has brought them to rest close to the highest point of the Southern Uplands and over 200 m higher than any currently occurring granite in the Galloway Hills.

Walking
The shortest route of ascent is from the car park in Glen Trool. The car park is located near Bruce's Stone, a monument commemorating the victory of Robert the Bruce over the English forces of Edward II at the Battle of Glen Trool in 1307. The Merrick is a relatively straightforward and easy hike from the car park near Bruce's Stone. The route climbs past the Culsharg bothy then up on to Benyellary. After dropping slightly the final climb to the summit trig-point is made. Be aware that if descending in poor visibility a very common mistake is to walk down the west ridge into remote terrain.

Climbing
Because of the nature of the rock, no good rock climbing has been recorded on the Merrick. However, in winter after a good freeze there are a number of good ice climbs of up to 200 m on the Black Gairy, which lies west of the summit.

Subsidiary SMC Summits

See also
 Galloway Hills
 Southern Uplands

References

External links

 The Merrick routes map, tourist trail and large images
 Link to computer-generated virtual panoramas from Merrick North South.

Marilyns of Scotland
Donald mountains
Corbetts
Mountains and hills of the Southern Uplands
Mountains and hills of Dumfries and Galloway
Climbing areas of Scotland
Highest points of historic Scottish counties